CRUMBS is an improvisational theatre duo based in Winnipeg, Manitoba, Canada.

The comedy duo formed in Winnipeg in 1997 and has since toured the world. They have toured in Europe more than any other improv act. The duo consists of two actors, Stephen Sim and Lee White. CRUMBS also performs with musical accompanist Dj Hunnicutt, who is known to improvise not only a soundtrack, but also with live video elements. Other members include videographers, musicians, photographers, webmasters, illustrators, producers, agents, publicists, graphic designers, costume designers and hair and make-up artists. Since forming in 1997, they have been to festivals and shows in North America and Europe. CRUMBS has performed across the world, including multiple appearances at the Berlin International Improv Festival, as well as winning tournaments in Vancouver, Toronto, Winnipeg, Edmonton and elsewhere. They also perform regularly in the Winnipeg Fringe Theatre Festival and with Edmonton's Rapid Fire Theatre. CRUMBS specializes in longform improvisation.

References

External links
 Crumbs Improv website
 Article about CRUMBS on Improvisation.ca 
 German improv website article

Improvisational theatre in Canada